The 12191 / 12192 Jabalpur–New Delhi Superfast Express is a daily Superfast Mail/Express train of the Indian Railways that runs between Jabalpur Junction railway station of Jabalpur, one of the important city & military cantonment hub of Central India state of Madhya Pradesh and  railway station of Delhi, the capital city of India.

Arrival and departure
Train no.12192 departs from Jabalpur daily at 17:30 hrs. reaching Hazrat Nizamuddin the next day at 11:35 hrs.
Train no.12191 departs from Hazrat Nizamuddin, daily at 14:15 hrs., reaching Jabalpur the next day at 07:15 hrs.

Route & Halts
The train goes via , Itarsi Junction & Bhopal Junction. The important halts of the train are :
Jabalpur Junction
 Jabalpur Madan Mahal
 Gotegaon
 Narsinghpur
 Gadarwara
 Pipariya
 Itarsi Junction
 Hoshangabad
 Bhopal Habibganj
 Bhopal Junction
 Vidisha
 Ganj Basoda
 Bina Junction
 Lalitpur
 Jhansi Junction 
 Datia
 Gwalior Junction
 Morena
 Dholpur
 Agra Cantt.
 
Hazrat Nizamuddin

Coach composition
The train consists of 17 coaches :
 1 AC cum 2 AC I Tier [HA 1]
 1 AC II Tier
 3 AC III Tier
 8 Sleeper coaches
 6 Un Reserved
 1 Ladies/Handy Capped
 1 Luggage/Brake Van

Average speed and frequency
The train runs with an average speed of 70 km/h. The train runs on a daily basis.

Loco link
The train is hauled by a Tughlakabad-based WAP-7 or Itarsi-based WAP-4 locomotive from end to end.

Rake sharing

The train sharing its rake with 12181/12182 Dayodaya Express.

Rake maintenance 
The train is maintained by the Jabalpur Coaching Depot.

See also
Dayodaya Express
Jabalpur Junction
Bhopal Junction

References

Express trains in India
Transport in Delhi
Transport in Jabalpur
Railway services introduced in 2005
Rail transport in Madhya Pradesh
Rail transport in Uttar Pradesh
Rail transport in Delhi